Andreas Dückstein (born 2 August 1927, in Budapest) is an Austrian chess master. He was awarded the title of International Master by FIDE in 1956. In his prime, Dückstein was regarded as a dangerous attacker. as a win against World Champion Mikhail Botvinnik demonstrated.

Born in Hungary, he left for Austria at the age of 22. Dückstein was thrice Austrian Champion (1954, 1956, 1977).

He tied for 11–13th at Zagreb 1955 (Vasily Smyslov won), took 14th at Wageningen 1957 (zonal, László Szabó won), took 5th at Hastings 1958/59 (Wolfgang Uhlmann won), shared 2nd at Berg en Dal (zonal, Friðrik Ólafsson won), tied for 4–6th at Vienna 1961 (Yuri Averbakh won), took 3rd at Amsterdam 1964 (IBM, Bent Larsen won), took 4th at Palma de Mallorca 1965.

He played for Austria in several Chess Olympiads:
 In 1956, at second board in 12th Chess Olympiad in Moscow (+11 –2 =4);
 In 1958, at first board in 13th Chess Olympiad in Munich (+6 –5 =8);
 In 1962, at second board in 15th Chess Olympiad in Varna (+2 –6 =2);
 In 1964, at first board in 16th Chess Olympiad in Tel Aviv (+8 –5 =3);
 In 1968, at first board in 18th Chess Olympiad in Lugano (+5 –2 =5);
 In 1970, at first board in 19th Chess Olympiad in Siegen (+4 –2 =6);
 In 1974, at second board in 21st Chess Olympiad in Nice (+8 –0 =4);
 In 1976, at second board in 22nd Chess Olympiad in Haifa (+5 –4 =1);
 In 1988, at second reserve board in 28th Chess Olympiad in Thessaloniki (+2 –2 =3).
He won two individual gold medals, at Moscow 1956 and at Nice 1974, and was awarded the International Master (IM) title in 1956.

References

1927 births
Living people
Hungarian Jews
Chess International Masters
Chess Olympiad competitors
Austrian Jews
Hungarian chess players
Austrian chess players
Jewish chess players
Sportspeople from Budapest
Hungarian emigrants to Austria